Cavalcantia is a genus of flowering plants in thefamily Asteraceae, endemic to the State of Pará in Brazil.

 Species
 Cavalcantia glomerata (G.M.Barroso & R.M.King) R.M.King & H.Rob. - Pará
 Cavalcantia percymosa R.M.King & H.Rob. - Pará

References

Eupatorieae
Endemic flora of Brazil
Asteraceae genera